Luly Yang is a Taiwanese-American fashion designer. She is also a creative artist and an internationally recognized fashion designer. Yang has her own couture fashion (Luly Yang Couture) in Seattle and her designs have earned her plenty of local and international business and recognition. Luly Yang Couture is a fashion house, founded in 2000, that conceived itself as being the finest provider of bridal gowns, evening wear, and suiting.  After completing the uniform design for all Alaska Airlines employees in 2018, Yang launched Luly Yang Design Group, specializing in ready to wear and uniform design.

Early life and education 
Yang received a BA in Graphic Design from the University of Washington, She worked in branding and graphic design in the field of architecture prior to launching her eponymous label.

In 1999, Yang created her signature Monarch Butterfly Gown for a fashion show benefiting the Art with Heart Foundation, and began a move into fashion design. This dress was one that she originally created for a fashion design contest aimed at graphic designers. She featured monarch butterflies because of the metamorphosis that they represent.

Career 

Yang opened her Seattle-based couture studio in 2000 with twelve bridal gowns. She subsequently branched out into cocktail, evening wear and menswear.

In 2004, she moved her design studio to the Fairmont Olympic Hotel on 4th Avenue in Downtown Seattle.

In 2008, Yang showcased her couture and bridal collections at The Fairmont Hotel in Beijing as well as accessories designed for the new location. Her collections became available in Europe five years later when he work was exhibited at the department store Popp & Kretschmer in Vienna, Austria.

In 2015, she expanded her business with two new ready-to-wear lines, Luly Yang and Luly. The new labels, along with her previous collections are currently sold online and at her Seattle boutique, both of which also include a line of accessories, couture, bridal, cocktail, eveningwear, and suiting.

In 2021, Yang launched an all-new label called Luleisure, an activewear and travel line. Luleisure allows you to wear things that can carry you from brunch to business, through all seasons, or even travel. The collection launched with a luxury pop up shop at the SeaTac Airport North Satellite Alaska Airlines Lounge.

Commissioned work 
In 2007, Yang was commissioned by the Pan Pacific Hotel to design their new uniforms for their grand opening in Anaheim, California.

In 2009, she was invited to design the costumes for Teatro ZinZanni, whose cast included Liliane Montevecchi.

In 2016, Yang was selected to redesign the uniforms for Alaska Airlines' 12,000 employees. These uniforms was originally planned to be worn by Alaska Airlines staff members in 2018. They eventually rolled out in 2019. The design of the uniforms was inspired by Chinese culture. Such features include resemblances to a qipao and a “Chinese-style” collar.

Of the Alaska Airlines uniforms, the Daily Mail wrote, “Are these the coolest cabin crew uniforms in the skies? Alaska Airlines unveils new outfits created by a high-end ballgown designer (and the fashion experts are wowed).”

For design of the Alaska Airlines uniforms, Yang won the North American Uniform Manufacturers and Distributers (NAUMD) Image of the Year Award.

In 2018 Luly was commissioned by Amazon to design and produce uniforms for Amazon Delivery Service Providers. For these designs she’d receive the North American Uniform Manufacturers and Distributers (NAUMD) Image of the Year Award.

In 2021, Luly Yang Design Group designed the uniforms for the Hospitality Team at Climate Pledge Arena located in Seattle, Washington.

In 2022, the Space Needle announced in a joint press release their collaboration with Luly Yang Design Group for the launch of their new uniform collection.

Luly Yang Couture 
Luly Yang was born in Taiwan and her family moved to Bellevue, Washington when she was 10 years old and from a very early age, she was fascinated by design and creativity. She received her Bachelor of Arts Degree in Graphic Design from the School of Art at the University of Washington. Yang's professional career began in graphic design and architecture. Her evolution into fashion design began in 1999 when she was invited to participate in a fashion competition for the Art with Heart Foundation. Here she created her first signature “Monarch Gown” by designing a butterfly wing pattern and printing it on large sheets of paper. After receiving excessive high praise, this moment proved to be the turning point for her career through which she eventually and officially stepped into the world of fashion design . Soon after achieving success in the fashion show for the Art in the Heart Foundation, Luly founded her own Seattle-based Couture Studio in 2000 with 12 bridal gowns. The brand worked mainly within 3 segments: cocktail, evening wear, and menswear. After the success and growth in business for Luly Yang Couture, Luly moved her design studio to the Fairmont Olympic Hotel on 4th Avenue in Downtown, Seattle in 2004,  In 2007, Luly was selected by the Pan Pacific Hotel to design their uniforms for the grand opening of the hotel. In 2008, they partnered up with The Fairmont Hotel in Beijing to showcase their collection. LYC then introduced two new product lines under the category of ready to wear. Currently, the Luly Yang Couture Boutique and online store feature accessories, couture, bridal wear, cocktail, evening wear, leisurewear and suiting.

Luly Yang Design Group 
In 2016, Luly Couture was selected to revamp the uniforms for 12,000 employees of Alaska Airlines. Following the success of the uniform program and high praise from the employees, Luly attracted the interest of the Washington Athletic Club and Amazon before establishing the Luly Yang Design Group (LYDG).

Philanthropy

Yang's shows have additionally benefited non-profit organizations such as Camp Korey, Seattle Children's Hospital, Swedish Medical Center, Susan G. Komen For the Cure, Treehouse, Pacific Northwest Ballet, Smuin Ballet San Francisco, Seattle Symphony, Fred Hutch Cancer Research Center, and Providence Senior & Community Services. Luly Yang worked with Russell Wilson to raise funds for Strong Against Cancer.

Throughout the Covid-19 pandemic, Luly Yang made and donated tens of thousands of masks to her Pacific Northwest Community in efforts to stop the spread of coronavirus.

Reception
Luly Yang was given recognition in a behind-the-scenes video about the MOHAI Exhibit. The Seattle Times Moira Macdonald praised her for “creative thinking and hard work,” which gave her an international reputation.

The Nellie Cashman “Woman Business Owner of the Year” Award 2007
Puget Sound Business Journal’s “40 under 40” Award.
Puget Sound Business Journal “Women of Influence” 2010, For outstanding business and philanthropic contributions to the Puget Sound Community
The Knot “Best of Weddings Pick” 2008, 2009, 2010, 2012.
University of Washington 150th years of Creativity “Timeless Award” 2012.
Puget Sound Business Journal “Woman of Influence” 2012 
Hong Kong Association of Washington, HKAW “Outstanding Business Leader Award” 2015
Induction into the Robert Chinn Foundation's Asian Hall of Fame
NAUMD Image of the Year Award® 2020 acknowledgement for Alaska Airlines uniform design

 NAUMD Image of the Year Award® 2021 for Amazon Delivery Service uniforms
 NAUMD Best Public Safety Product Innovation Award for Technical, Reusable Face Masks
 Platinum MUSE Design Award 2021 - Amazon Uniforms
 Platinum MUSE Design Award 2021 - Runway Collection, Butterfly Effect Collection
 Gold MUSE Design Award 2021 - Haute Couture, Luly Yang Eclipse Collection
 Gold MUSE Design Award 2021 - Bridal,  Luly Yang Transformative Collection
 Gold IDA Award 2021- Alaska Airlines Uniform Program
 Gold IDA Award 2021- Luly Yang Bridal
 Silver IDA Award 2021- Haute Couture ‘Eclipse’ Collection
 Silver IDA Award 2021- Amazon Delivery Services Uniforms
 Bronze IDA Award 2021- Avant Garde ‘Museum’ Collection
 Seattle Bride Magazine- 2022 Best of Bride: Custom Gowns
 Gold MUSE Design Award 2022 - Uniforms and Costumes, Amazon Air
 Gold MUSE Design Award 2022 - Fashion Design: Limited Edition, Luleisure
 Silver MUSE Design Award 2022 - Fashion Design: Recycle/Sustainable Fashion, Climate Pledge Arena
 Silver MUSE Design Award 2022 - Fashion Design: Safety & Protection, Face Masks
 Silver MUSE Design Award 2022 - Fashion Design: Ready-made, Face Masks
 Silver MUSE Design Award 2022 - Fashion Design: Covid 19 Related, Face Masks
 NAUMD Image of the Year Award® 2021 for Restaurant & Food Service: Single Location, Climate Pledge Arena
 Red Dot Design Award 2022 - Fashion and Lifestyle, Museum Collection

References 

American fashion businesspeople
American fashion designers
American women fashion designers
University of Washington School of Art + Art History + Design alumni
Living people
Year of birth missing (living people)
21st-century American women